The 2014 Pan American Judo Championships was held in Guayaquil, Ecuador from April 24–26, 2014.

Medal table

Results

Men's events

Women's events

References

External links
 
 Pan American Judo Confederation

American Championships
2014 in Ecuadorian sport
2014
Judo competitions in Ecuador
International sports competitions hosted by Ecuador